Brickellia spinulosa is a North American species of flowering plants in the family Asteraceae. It is native to northern and western Mexico (Chihuahua, Durango, Nuevo León, San Luis Potosí, Jalisco, Zacatecas).

References

External links
photo of herbarium specimen collected in Nuevo León

spinulosa
Flora of Chihuahua (state)
Flora of Durango
Flora of Nuevo León
Flora of San Luis Potosí
Flora of Jalisco
Flora of Zacatecas
Plants described in 1849